The untitled The Walking Dead series starring Rick Grimes and Michonne is an upcoming American post-apocalyptic television series based on The Walking Dead. It is a spin-off of the television series based on the comic book with Andrew Lincoln and Danai Gurira reprising their roles from the series. It is intended to be the seventh installment of The Walking Dead franchise and is scheduled to premiere in 2024 on AMC and AMC+.

Cast and characters
 Andrew Lincoln as Rick Grimes, a former sheriff's deputy from King County, Georgia, and the former leader of the Alexandria Safe-Zone who was presumed to be dead following "What Comes After".
 Danai Gurira as Michonne, a katana-wielding warrior and Rick's romantic partner who left the group to search for her lover following "What We Become".

Production

Development 
The series was announced in July 2022 by Scott M. Gimple, Andrew Lincoln and Danai Gurira at San Diego Comic-Con 2022. Lincoln and Gurira signed on to reprise their respective roles from the television series. The first season will consist of six episodes and is intended to be a continuing series.

Writing 
The series was created by Gimple and Gurira, who will also write for the series, with Gimple serving as showrunner. The series was set up by The Walking Deads series finale "Rest in Peace", which featured the return of Rick and Michonne.

Filming 
Principal photography began on February 15, 2023, and is set to conclude in May 2023, under the working title Summit.

Release 
The series is scheduled to premiere in 2024.

References

External links